Umurbek Bazarbayev (born September 17, 1981,  in Ýylanly, Dasoguz Province, Turkmenistan) is a Turkmenistani weightlifter. His personal best is 303 kg, achieved at the 2011 World Championships.

He ranked sixth in the 62 kg category at the 2004 Summer Olympics, with a total of 287.5 kg.

At the 2008 Asian Championships he won the overall bronze medal, with a total of 296 kg.

He competed in Weightlifting at the 2008 Summer Olympics in the 62 kg division but did not finish.

At the 2012 Summer Olympics, he again finished 6th, with a total of 302 kg.

He is 5 ft 4 inches tall and weighs 143 lb.

Notes and references

External links
 NBC profile
 Athlete Biography at Beijing 2008
 Athlete Biography  at London 2012

Turkmenistan male weightlifters
Uzbeks
1981 births
Living people
People from Daşoguz Region
Weightlifters at the 2000 Summer Olympics
Weightlifters at the 2004 Summer Olympics
Weightlifters at the 2008 Summer Olympics
Weightlifters at the 2012 Summer Olympics
Olympic weightlifters of Turkmenistan
Weightlifters at the 1998 Asian Games
Weightlifters at the 2002 Asian Games
Weightlifters at the 2006 Asian Games
Weightlifters at the 2010 Asian Games
Weightlifters at the 2014 Asian Games
Asian Games competitors for Turkmenistan